Jimmy McClure was an early twentieth-century soccer outside right who spent five seasons in the American Soccer League.

Beginning in 1924 with Philadelphia Field Club, McClure spent five seasons in the American Soccer League with five teams.  His best season came in 1926-1927 when he scored eleven goals in thirty-two games for Philadelphia.

External links

References

American Soccer League (1921–1933) players
Bethlehem Steel F.C. (1907–1930) players
Brooklyn Wanderers players
Indiana Flooring players
Providence Clamdiggers players
Philadelphia Field Club players
Association football forwards
American soccer players
Year of birth missing